Schizomussaenda is a monotypic genus of flowering plants belonging to the family Rubiaceae. The only species is Schizomussaenda henryi.

Its native range is Indo-China to Southern China.

References

Rubiaceae
Monotypic Rubiaceae genera